Jean-François Séguier (25 November 1703 – 1 September 1784) was a French archaeologist, epigraphist, astronomer and botanist from Nîmes.

He studied law in Montpellier, during which time, he developed a passion for botany. He was a friend and collaborator to Scipio Maffei, with whom he took an extended scientific tour throughout Europe (1732–36). In 1755 he became a member of the Académie de Nîmes, serving as its secrétaire perpétuel from 1765 to 1784. In 1772 he became a member of the Académie royale des Inscriptions et Belles-Lettres.

The plant genus Seguieria (family Petiveriaceae, Loefl., 1758) commemorates his name, as do the botanical species Ranunculus seguieri (Vill., 1779), Euphorbia seguieriana (Neck., 1770), and Dianthus seguieri (Vill., 1779).<ref>{{cite web |url= https://www.ipni.org/n/153858-1 |title= Plants of the World Online: Dianthus seguieri, Vill. |access-date=2021-04-13 |publisher= Board of Trustees of the Royal Botanic Gardens, Kew }}</ref>

 Published works 

His written works include a detailed description of the flora in the vicinity of Verona, titled  (3 volumes 1745–54). Other noted works associated with Séguier are:
 Bibliotheca botanica, sive, Catalogus auctorum et librorum omnium qui de re botanica, de medicamentis ex vegetabilibus paratis, de re rustica, & de horticultura tractant, 1740. Séguier's Bibliotheca botanica includes Ovidio Montalbani's Bibliotheca botanica as an appendix.
 
 
 
 Dissertation sur l'ancienne inscription de la Maison-carrée de Nismes, 1759 – Dissertation on the ancient inscriptions of the Maison Carrée in Nîmes.
 Jean-François Séguier, Pierre Baux, lettres : 1733-1756''.

Standard author abbreviation

References 

1703 births
1784 deaths
People from Nîmes
French archaeologists
French epigraphers
18th-century French astronomers
18th-century French botanists
Members of the Académie des Inscriptions et Belles-Lettres